Jean-Luc Lagarce (14 February 1957 – 30 September 1995) was a French actor, theatre director and playwright. Although only moderately successful during his lifetime, since his death he has become one of the most widely-produced contemporary French playwrights.

Born in Héricourt, Haute-Saône, he was educated at the Université de Besançon. He was a cofounder of the Théâtre de La Roulotte in 1978, directing productions of playwrights such as Pierre de Marivaux, Eugène Marin Labiche and Eugène Ionesco before beginning to stage his own plays. Some of his early plays were criticized as derivative of Ionesco or Samuel Beckett. Although some of his plays were published by Théâtre Ouvert or recorded as radio dramas, only a few of them were ever staged during his lifetime.

Publishing 25 plays during his lifetime, he died of AIDS in 1995. He also published a volume of short stories, wrote an opera libretto and a film screenplay, and cofounded the publishing company Les Solitaires intempestifs. He was rediscovered by critics after his death, becoming more widely recognized as one of the most important modern French playwrights. This led to many productions overseas, such as the Brazilian version of Music-Hall by Luiz Päetow, which won the Theatre Shell Award in 2010.

In 2015, film director Xavier Dolan adapted Lagarce's Juste la fin du monde into the film It's Only the End of the World, which won the Grand Prix and the Ecumenical Jury Prize at the 2016 Cannes Film Festival. Le pays lointain was produced at theatre Odeon, Paris in 2019.

Works

Plays
 La bonne de chez Ducatel, 1977
 Erreur de construction, 1977
 Carthage, encore, 1978
 La Place de l'autre , 1979
 Voyage de Madame Knipper vers la Prusse Orientale, 1980
 Ici ou ailleurs, 1981
 Les Serviteurs, 1981
 Noce, 1982
 Vagues souvenirs de l'année de la peste, 1982
 Hollywood, 1983
 Histoire d'amour (repérages), 1983
 Retour à la citadelle, 1984
 Les Orphelins, 1984
 De Saxe, roman, 1985
 La Photographie, 1986
 Derniers remords avant l'oubli, 1987
 Les Solitaires intempestifs, 1987
 Music-hall, 1988
 Les Prétendants, 1989
 Juste la fin du monde, 1990 
 Histoire d'amour (derniers chapitres), 1990
 Les règles du savoir-vivre dans la société moderne, 1993
 Nous, les héros, 1993
 Nous, les héros (version sans le père), 1993
 J'étais dans ma maison et j'attendais que la pluie vienne, 1994
 Le Pays lointain, 1995

Prose 
 Trois récits, 1994, a collection of three short stories

Other fiction 
 Quichotte, 1989, libretto for a jazz opera by Mike Westbrook
 Retour à l'automne, screenplay cowritten with Gérard Bouysse

Non-fiction
 Théâtre et Pouvoir en Occident, a study of how dramatists have contended with political power, from Ancient Greece to the middle of the twentieth century
 Journal, volume 1: 1977–1990, volume 2: 1990–1995

References

1957 births
1995 deaths
20th-century French dramatists and playwrights
20th-century French male actors
French male dramatists and playwrights
French male stage actors
French male short story writers
20th-century French short story writers
Gay dramatists and playwrights
French theatre directors
French LGBT dramatists and playwrights
People from Héricourt, Haute-Saône
AIDS-related deaths in France
French gay writers
French gay actors
20th-century French male writers
LGBT theatre directors
20th-century French LGBT people